This is a list of impórtant colonial buiildings in Cartagena de Indias, in Colombia.

List

Fortifications

Squares

References

 
Lists of oldest buildings and structures in Colombia
Lists of churches
History of Cartagena, Colombia
 
Historic preservation
Architecture lists